Mount Kanasuta, often known as  is a hilled area near the Quebec–Ontario border in the Abitibi-Témiscamingue administrative region of Quebec, Canada.

Nomenclature 
Kanasuta is an Ojibwe, word that means “where the devils go dancing.” Mount Kanasuta is often known by its French language name Mont Kanasuta.

Description and location 
Mount Kanasuta is a geographical hilly area near the Quebec–Ontario border within the Abitibi-Témiscamingue administrative region of Quebec. The hills are located between the St. Lawrence River and Hudson Bay.

It incorporates two hills, known as K1 and K2, the later informally known as Lion Mountain, due to its shape.

History 

In 1686, the area was a portage route, used by French military commander Pierre de Troyes. Temagami First Nation former chief Ignace Tonené was buried near Mount Kanasuta after his death in 1916.

In contemporary times, it is known for its ski resort, located on K1.

In popular culture 
Kanasuta is also the name of an album by Richard Desjardins, a Canadian musician who advocated for greater environmental protection of the area.

References 

Ski areas and resorts in Quebec
Geographic regions of Quebec
Mountain ranges of Quebec